Ignacio Sánchez (born ) is a Spanish male volleyball player. He is part of the Spain men's national volleyball team. On club level he plays for CV Unicaja Almería.

References

External links
 profile at FIVB.org

1991 births
Living people
Spanish men's volleyball players
Place of birth missing (living people)